Vasile Jercălău (born 5 May 1968) is a Romanian former professional footballer.

References

External links
 

1968 births
Living people
People from Ialomița County
Romanian footballers
Association football defenders
Liga I players
FC Dinamo București players
FCM Bacău players
CSM Flacăra Moreni players
CSM Unirea Alba Iulia players
FC Unirea Urziceni players